Vistara, is an Indian full-service airline, based in Gurgaon, with its hub at Delhi. The carrier, a joint venture between Tata Sons and Singapore Airlines, commenced operations on 9 January 2015 with its inaugural flight between Delhi and Mumbai.

, Vistara serves a total of 43 destinations including 11 international destinations. On 6 August 2019, The airline launched its first international flight from Delhi to Singapore using a  aircraft which was earlier used by Jet Airways. It also operates flights to various destinations in the Middle East, Europe, and Southeast Asia as well from its hubs.

In March 2020, Vistara had suspended all international flights due to the COVID-19 pandemic. Normal flight operations resumed in March 2022.

List

References

Vistara
Vistara